The ANZAC Squadron, also called the Allied Naval Squadron, was an Allied naval warship task force which was tasked with defending northeast Australia and surrounding area in early 1942 during the Pacific Campaign of World War II. The squadron, consisting of cruisers and destroyers from the navies of Australia, New Zealand, and the United States was formed on February 12, 1942, under the command of Royal Navy Rear Admiral John Gregory Crace.  The squadron was the primary fleet element operating in the ANZAC Area under the overall command of United States Navy Vice Admiral Herbert Fairfax Leary.

On 9 March, the squadron, as part of Task Force 11 known as Task Group 11.7, covered the Louisiade Archipelago, securing the right hand flank of Task Force 11 and Task Force 17 for the attack on Lae and Salamaua due to the Imperial Japanese invasion of Lae-Salamaua, New Guinea and also covering a Port Moresby reinforcement convoy. On April 22, 1942, the ANZAC Force was absorbed by the South West Pacific Area (command) under United States Army General Douglas MacArthur and the ANZAC Squadron was redesignated as Task Force 44. The New Zealand cruisers passed to the control of the South Pacific Area.

Ships of the task force
Heavy cruisers   (9 – 14 March),  (from 9 March),  (9 – 14 March) and 
Light cruisers  and 
Destroyers  (9 – 14 March),  (9 – 14 March) and

References

Bibliography 

Naval units and formations of World War II
ANZAC
ANZAC units and formations